Hitchens's razor is an epistemological razor (a general rule for rejecting certain knowledge claims) that states "what can be asserted without evidence can also be dismissed without evidence." The razor was created by and named after author and journalist Christopher Hitchens (1949–2011). It implies that the burden of proof regarding the truthfulness of a claim lies with the one who makes the claim; if this burden is not met, then the claim is unfounded, and its opponents need not argue further in order to dismiss it. Hitchens used this phrase specifically in the context of refuting religious belief.

Analysis 
The dictum appears in Hitchens's 2007 book titled God Is Not Great: How Religion Poisons Everything. The term 'Hitchens's razor' itself was used by atheist blogger Rixaeton in December 2010, and popularised inter alia by evolutionary biologist and atheist activist Jerry Coyne after Hitchens died in December 2011.

Some pages earlier in God Is Not Great, Hitchens also invoked Occam's razor. Michael Kinsley noted in 2007 in The New York Times that Hitchens was rather fond of applying Occam's razor to religious claims, and according to The Wall Street Journal Jillian Melchior in 2017, the phrase "What can be asserted without evidence can be dismissed without evidence" was "Christopher Hitchens's variation of Occam's razor". 

Hitchens's razor has also been called "a modern version" of the Latin proverb quod grātīs asseritur, grātīs negātur ("what is freely asserted can be freely deserted"), also rendered as "what is asserted without reason (or proof), may be denied without reason (or proof)", a saying attested no later than the 17th century. Another comparable saying is the legal principle attributed to the Roman jurist Julius Paulus Prudentissimus ( 2nd–3rd century CE), Ei incumbit probatio qui dicit, non qui negat"Proof lies on he who asserts, not on he who denies". This principle has traditionally been connected to the presumption of innocence in English law, but in the 1980s philosopher Antony Flew argued that it was also an adequate preliminary axiom in debates about the existence of God, claiming that "the presumption of atheism" was justified until a theist could come up with good evidence in favour of the existence of a god.

Hitchens's razor has been presented alongside the Sagan standard ("Extraordinary claims require extraordinary evidence") as an example of evidentialism within the New Atheism movement.

Use in atheism criticism 

Academic philosopher Michael V. Antony (2010) argued that despite the use of Hitchens's razor to reject religious belief and to support atheism, applying the razor to atheism itself would seem to imply that atheism is epistemically unjustified. According to Antony, the New Atheists (to whom Hitchens also belonged) invoke a number of special arguments purporting to show that atheism can in fact be asserted without evidence.

Criticism 

Philosopher C. Stephen Evans (2015) outlined some common Christian theological responses to the argument made by Hitchens, Richard Dawkins and the other New Atheists that if religious belief is not based on evidence, it is not reasonable and can thus be dismissed without evidence. Characterising the New Atheists as evidentialists, Evans counted himself amongst the Reformed epistemologists together with Alvin Plantinga, who argued for a version of foundationalism, namely: "belief in God can be reasonable even if the believer has no arguments or propositional evidence on which the belief is based." The idea is that all beliefs are based on other beliefs, and some "foundational" or "basic beliefs" just need to be assumed to be true in order to start somewhere, and it is fine to pick God as one of those basic beliefs.

See also

References

External links

Agnosticism
Adages
Reductionism
Heuristics
Principles
Philosophy of science
Ontology
Razors (philosophy)
Christopher Hitchens
Skepticism
Eponyms